Neurochondrin (also known as its murine homologue, Norbin) is a protein that in humans is encoded by the NCDN gene.

This gene encodes a leucine-rich cytoplasmic protein, which is highly similar to a mouse protein norbin that negatively regulates Ca/calmodulin-dependent protein kinase II phosphorylation and may be essential for spatial learning processes. Several alternatively spliced transcript variants of this gene have been described.

Norbin can modulate signaling activity and expression of metabotropic glutamate receptor 5; modulating  mice with targeted deletion of NCDN in the brain have phenotypic traits usually found in the rodent models of schizophrenia, including disruptions in prepulse inhibition. Furthermore, norbin protein expression is altered in the schizophrenia brain. Norbin also plays a role in regulating antimicrobial responses in neutrophils.

Neurochondrin proteins induce hydroxyapatite resorptive activity in bone marrow cells resistant to bafilomycin A1, an inhibitor of macrophage- and osteoclast-mediated resorption. Expression of the gene is localised to chondrocyte, osteoblast, and osteocyte in the bone and to the hippocampus and Purkinje cell layer of cerebellum in the brain.

References

Further reading